The byzaanchy (Tuvan: бызаанчы; Russian: Бизанчи; also transliterated byzanchi or byzanchie) is a four-stringed vertical spike fiddle used in the traditional music of Tuva.  It is similar to the Chinese sihu.  However, the byzaanchy's soundbox is generally made of wood whereas the sihu usually has a metal soundbox.  The byzaanchy's soundbox may be cylindrical or, more rarely, cubical.

The instrument's four strings are in courses of two, one of each pair tuned together, to the interval of a fifth.  The horsehair bow is divided into two portions of hair. A carved horse's head generally features at the top of the instrument's wooden neck.

See also
Music of Tuva
Sihu

External links
Byzaanchy photo
Byzaanchy photo
Byzaanchy photos
Byzaanchy description, photos, audio and video

Tuvan musical instruments
Huqin family instruments